Narguis Nabieva (born 20 February 1985) is an athlete from Tajikistan.  She competes in archery.

Nabieva represented Tajikistan at the 2004 Summer Olympics.  She placed 55th in the women's individual ranking round with a 72-arrow score of 600.  In the first round of elimination, she faced 10th-ranked Wu Hui Ju of Chinese Taipei.  Nabieva lost 156-142 in the 18-arrow match, placing 45th overall in women's individual archery.

References

External links

1985 births
Living people
Olympic archers of Tajikistan
Archers at the 2004 Summer Olympics
Tajikistani female archers
Archers at the 2002 Asian Games
Asian Games competitors for Tajikistan